The railway from Tours to Saint-Nazaire is an important French 282-kilometre long railway line, following the lower course of the river Loire. It is used for passenger (express, regional and suburban) and freight traffic. The railway was opened in several stages between 1848 and 1857.

Main stations
 Tours station
 Saumur station
 Angers-Saint-Laud station
 Nantes station
 Saint-Nazaire station

Line history

Construction of the railway was started by the Chemin de Fer de Tours à Nantes, that became part of the Chemin de Fer de Paris à Orléans in 1852. The section between Tours and Saumur was opened in 1848. Saumur was linked to Angers in 1849, and the section between Angers and Nantes was opened in 1851. Finally, the section between Nantes and Saint-Nazaire was opened in 1857.

References

Railway lines in Centre-Val de Loire
Railway lines in Pays de la Loire
1848 establishments in France